After Love (French: Après l'amour) is a 1924 French silent drama film directed by Maurice Champreux and starring André Nox, Jeanne Provost and Blanche Montel. It is based on the play of the same title by Pierre Wolff and Henri Duvernois. It was remade twice in sound, the 1931 film When Love Is Over and After Love in 1948.

Cast
 André Nox as François Mésaule
 Jeanne Provost as 	Nicole Mésaule
 Blanche Montel as 	Germaine By
 Henri-Amédée Charpentier as Émile, le domestique
 Daout as Madame Lephiernand
 de Kerdec as Fournier
 Julio de Romero as Martelet
 Delettre as Suzanne Trèfle
 Émile Drain as Lephiernand
 Yvette Langlais as Le petit André
 Jean Napoléon Michel as Simon
 Maurice Sigrist as Jacques

References

Bibliography 
 Goble, Alan. The Complete Index to Literary Sources in Film. Walter de Gruyter, 1999.
 Limbacher, James L. Haven't I seen you somewhere before?: Remakes, sequels, and series in motion pictures and television, 1896-1978. Pierian Press, 1979.
 Taillé, Daniel. Léonce Perret, cinématographiste. Association "Cinémathèque en Deux-Sèvres", 2006.

External links 
 

1924 films
French silent feature films
1920s French-language films
Films directed by Maurice Champreux
French films based on plays
French drama films
1924 drama films
Gaumont Film Company films
Silent drama films
1920s French films